Zond 8, also known as L-1 No.14, was the last in the series of circumlunar spacecraft, a member of the Soviet Zond program, designed to rehearse a piloted circumlunar flight, an uncrewed version of Soyuz 7K-L1 crewed circumlunar flight spacecraft. The project was initiated in 1965 to compete with the Americans in the race to the Moon but lost its importance once three astronauts circled the Moon on the Apollo 8 mission in December 1968.

Mission
Zond 8 was launched on 20 October 1970, at 19:55:39 GMT by a Proton-K / Blok D launcher from Site 81/23 of the Baikonur Cosmodrome, towards the Moon. The announced objectives of Zond 8 were investigations of the Moon and circumlunar space and testing of onboard systems and units.

The spacecraft transmitted flight images of Earth for three days. The minimum distance from the Moon during the mission was 1,120 kilometres (696 miles) from the lunar surface. Scientific measurements were also obtained during the flight.

After two mid-course corrections on the return leg, Zond 8 achieved a return trajectory over Earth's northern hemisphere instead of the standard southern approach profile, allowing Soviet ground control stations to maintain near-continuous contact with the craft. The guidance system, however, malfunctioned on the return leg, and the spacecraft performed a simple ballistic (instead of a guided) reentry into Earth's atmosphere. The reentry was different from other reentries in the Zond program as it went over the north pole and landed in the Indian Ocean.

The USSR recovery ship Taman was on hand to collect it and bring it back to Moscow.

The Soviet Kremlin officials finally decided to cancel the L1 project in 1970.

Scientific instruments
 Imaging system
 Solar wind collector packages

Zond 9
Zond 9, Soyuz 7K-L1 s/n 10, was planned but cancelled. Zond 9 was planned to launch in July 1969, carrying a crew of Pavel Popovich and Vitali Sevastyanov, but never flew.

Zond 10
Zond 10, Soyuz 7K-L1 s/n 15, was planned but cancelled.

See also

 Splashdown (spacecraft landing)
 Timeline of artificial satellites and space probes

References

External links
 Soviet Lunar Images
 Astronautix.com - detailed on Soyuz 7K-L1 (Zond) program 
 

Missions to the Moon
Zond program
1970 in the Soviet Union
Spacecraft launched in 1970
Spacecraft which reentered in 1970
Lunar flybys